Şesuri may refer to several villages in Romania:

 Şesuri, a village in Măgirești Commune, Bacău County
 Şesuri, a village in Bucureșci Commune, Hunedoara County
 Şesuri, a village in Cârlibaba Commune, Suceava County